Georgina Wheatcroft (born November 30, 1965 in Nanaimo, British Columbia as Georgina Hawkes) is a Canadian curler. She won a bronze medal at the 2002 Winter Olympics while on Kelley Law's team.

Curling career 
Wheatcroft made her Scott Tournament of Hearts, the Canadian women's national championship, debut in 1987 as a third for Pat Sanders. Wheatcroft's prior experience had been as a skip at the Canadian Junior Curling Championships in 1985 for British Columbia. Sanders, Wheatcroft, and their British Columbia team won the 1987 Scott Tournament of Hearts, defeating Kathie Ellwood in the final. At the World Championships that year, the team won the gold medal defeating Germany's Andrea Schöpp in the final. In 1988 Wheatcroft played second for Sanders at the Tournament of Hearts and they lost in the final to Heather Houston. In 1989, Wheatcroft moved to Julie Sutton's team and again qualified for the Tournament of Hearts, where they would lose in their first playoff game. Wheatcroft would not go back to the Hearts until 2000.

In 2000, Wheatcroft played second for Kelley Law's rink. With Law, Wheatcroft won that year's Scott Tournament of Hearts and World Curling Championships. The team were runners up at the following 2001 Scott Tournament of Hearts, where they lost to Colleen Jones. The following year the team qualified for the 2002 Winter Olympics as Team Canada. The team defeated Team United States to win the bronze medal.

In 2004, Wheatcroft skipped her own team to the 2004 Scott Tournament of Hearts, but her new team finished 4-7. She attempted to qualify the following year, but lost in the British Columbia playdowns. In 2005, she was picked up by that year's Hearts champion Jennifer Jones to replace Cathy Gauthier, and she moved to Winnipeg, Manitoba to play with the team. With her new team, Wheatcroft played in that year's Olympic trials; the team finished with a 5-4 record. Wheatcroft had the opportunity to play in the 2006 Scott Tournament of Hearts because Jones had won it the previous year, and thus got to play as Team Canada. The team lost in the final to Kelly Scott of British Columbia.

2006 saw Wheatcroft return to playing with Kelley Law, as her third. In 2007, the team made their way back to the national championship, now called the Scotties Tournament of Hearts, after winning the B.C. Provincial Championship. At the Scotties they finished with a 5-6 record.

In 2008, she once again skipped her own team and qualified for the 2009 British Columbia Scotties Tournament of Hearts.

Grand Slam record

Teams

References

External links
 

Curlers from Manitoba
Curlers from British Columbia
Olympic curlers of Canada
Olympic bronze medalists for Canada
Curlers at the 2002 Winter Olympics
World curling champions
Canadian women curlers
Sportspeople from Nanaimo
Living people
1965 births
Canadian women's curling champions
Olympic medalists in curling
Medalists at the 2002 Winter Olympics
Continental Cup of Curling participants
Canadian curling coaches
Canada Cup (curling) participants